Aliaksandr Azarau is a former police investigator in Belarusian security services including the Investigative Committee of Belarus and GUBOPiK. , he is head of the Belarusian opposition police group BYPOL. He was appointed to the United Transitional Cabinet of the Belarusian opposition in August 2022, with responsibility for law and order.

Childhood and early education
He was brought up in Frunzyenski District in Minsk. His father, a construction worker, died from electrocution when Azarau was 11 and his mother was an engineer. Azarau expected to become a banker.

Police officer
After obtaining his law degree, Azarau started work in the police as an investigator at the Investigative Committee of Belarus. He obtained degrees from Belarus State Economic University and Minsk State Linguistic University while working as an investigator.

Azarau worked at GUBOPiK, a Belarusian security service, from 2008 to around 2018, as a specialist in investigating human trafficking. Azarau claims that from 2015, he "openly defended Ukrainians" within his service, leading to internal conflict. He reached that status of lieutenant-colonel as head of a GUBOPiK unit.

Following his time at GUBOPiK, Azarau was shifted to the Academy of the Minister of the Interior, becoming a lecturer.

BYPOL and United Transitional Cabinet
Azarau resigned from official police duties and joined BYPOL (Association of Security Forces of Belarus), an organisation of Belarusian former security officers who oppose the Alexander Lukashenko presidency of Belarus. Azarau was the head of BYPOL Foundation when it was created in May 2021.

As head of BYPOL, Azarau judged BYPOL's role in the 2022 rail war in Belarus as having helped to reverse the 2022 Russian military offensive that aimed to conquer Kyiv, the capital of Ukraine.

In August 2022, Azarau was appointed to the United Transitional Cabinet, with responsibility for law and order.

Relation to Lukashenko government
Azarau sees himself as having never "supported Lukashenko" and aimed to serve the interests of Belarusians. He stated that he personally saw fraud in the 2020 Belarusian presidential election and illegal orders of repression in the protests that followed the election.

In May 2021, Azarau estimated that many members of the official Belarusian security forces did not wish to support activities of repression, but worried about being unemployable if they resigned. He predicted that at a "critical moment", only a small number of security forces would defend Lukashenko, and employees who "doubt [and] silently go to work" would support the anti-Lukashenko opposition.

Personal life
, Azarau lives in Warsaw with his wife and two daughters who attend school there.

Harassment
Belarusian authorities seized Azarau's Belarusian bank accounts in 2021. Security forces searched Azarau's mother's home, confiscated her electronic devices, and visited people who had telephoned her. Azarau interpreted the events as harassment, that effectively frightened friends and family from contacting his mother.

Azarau believes that Belarusian spies were sent to Poland to spy on Azarau and "eliminate" BYPOL leadership.

References

Living people
Belarusian politicians
Year of birth missing (living people)